Edward Deming Andrews (March 6, 1894 – June 6, 1964) was an American historian, educator, curator, and preeminent authority on the United Society of Believers in Christ's Second Appearing, or the Shakers.

Life and career 
Born into a working-class family in Pittsfield, Massachusetts, Andrews received a BA from Amherst College in 1916 and a PhD in education from Yale University in 1930. He taught high-school English and social studies from 1920 to 1927 and worked as curator of history at the New York State Museum from 1931 to 1933. Andrews' interest in Shakerism began in 1923, and he received a Guggenheim Fellowship in American history in 1937 to advance his research into Shaker material culture.

From 1941 to 1956, Andrews taught at Scarborough Day School, in Scarborough-on-Hudson, New York, where he served as dean and history department chair. He frequently corresponded with Thomas Merton. The Winterthur Museum, Garden and Library holds his collection of manuscripts and published materials concerning Shakerism. This collection was the subject of a monograph by E. Richard McKinstry, The Edward Deming Andrews Memorial Shaker Collection (Garland, 1987).

Andrews died in Pittsfield in 1964. His wife and research collaborator, Faith (Young) Andrews, completed and posthumously published several of his monographs on Shakerism. The couple had married in 1921 and two children together.

Publications

Andrews authored nine books on the subject of Shakerism, including the following titles (some posthumously published):

Further reading

References

1894 births
1964 deaths
People from Pittsfield, Massachusetts
Amherst College alumni
Yale University alumni
American male non-fiction writers
20th-century American male writers
20th-century American non-fiction writers
Shaker scholars
Historical preservationists
American collectors
Collectors of Shaker artifacts
20th-century American historians
Schoolteachers from New York (state)
People associated with Winterthur Museum, Garden and Library